Richard Beckford (died 12 August 1796) was an English Whig politician.

Biography
Beckford was one the first mixed-race Member's of Pariament of the Parliament of the United Kingdom and served for the constituencies of Bridport, Arundel and Leominster from 1780 until his death in 1796.

He previously, unsuccessfully, attempted to be elected to Hindon in both 1774, against Thomas Brand Hollis and Richard Smith, and the 1775 by-election when both Smith and Hollis were removed from office for bribery, but was unsuccessful.

Beckford's father, William Beckford, was an MP and plantation owner, whilst his mother was a Jamaican slave.

References

See also 

 List of ethnic minority politicians in the United Kingdom
Year of birth missing
1796 deaths
British people of Jamaican descent
British MPs 1780–1784
British MPs 1784–1790
British MPs 1790–1796
British MPs 1796–1800
18th-century British politicians
People from Arundel
People from Bridport
People from Leominster
Black British MPs
Black British politicians
Whig (British political party) MPs for English constituencies